Joseph C. Lorigo (born November 18, 1981) is an American politician and jurist. A Conservative, he served as a member of the Erie County, New York Legislature, representing Legislative District 10, which comprises rural towns in southeastern Erie County and the first-ring Buffalo suburb of West Seneca. He currently serves as a justice on the New York State Supreme Court.

Early life and career
Lorigo was born in Buffalo, New York to Ralph C. Lorigo and Debbie (née Caruana) Lorigo. He earned a Bachelor's degree in Psychology from Canisius College in 2003, and then earned a Juris Doctor degree from the University at Buffalo Law School and a Master of Business Administration degree from the University at Buffalo School of Management in 2007.

After graduation, he worked as a lawyer at The Law Office of Ralph C. Lorigo. 

Lorigo unsuccessfully ran for West Seneca town justice in 2010.

Erie County Legislature
Lorigo won election to the Erie County, New York legislature in 2011, defeating incumbent Christina Wleklinski Bove. He won re-election in 2013, 2015, 2017, 2019 and 2021.

He caucused with the Republican legislators during his time in the legislature. After his first term, the legislature's Republican caucus elected Lorigo as the majority leader of the Erie County Legislature in 2014 until the Democratic Party took over control of the legislature in 2017. After the Democratic Party takeover of the legislature, Lorigo was elected as the minority leader.

Throughout his tenure, Lorigo worked for transparency and accountability in County government. He fought for lower taxes and improved investment in infrastructure.

New York State Supreme Court
In 2022, Lorigo announced he was a candidate for a justice position on the New York State Supreme Court. That year, there were 5 positions open for election, however 4 of the 5 positions received cross-endorsements from both the Democratic and Republican parties, an often controversial practice allowed for in states that allow electoral fusion. 

These cross endorsements guarantee victory for those 4 candidates. Lorigo was not one of the candidates who received a cross endorsement. Instead, he entered the race with only the backing of the Republican and Conservative parties.

Lorigo defeated Buffalo City Court Judge Shannon Heneghan on Election Day. His victory was considered the only Erie County "GOP gain" on Election Day 2022.

Personal life
Prior to being elected to the State Supreme Court, Lorigo worked at the Law Offices of Ralph C. Lorigo, since 2007. 

Joseph is married to Lindsay Bratek-Lorigo, who is currently a candidate to succeed him in the legislature.

They reside in West Seneca, New York, with their son.

References

Living people
1981 births
Conservative Party of New York State politicians
University at Buffalo Law School alumni
Canisius College alumni
21st-century American politicians
People from Erie County, New York